Varzaq-e Jonubi Rural District is a rural district (dehestan) in the Central District of Faridan County, Isfahan Province, Iran. At the 2006 census, its population was 8,862, in 2,150 families.  The rural district has 9 villages.

References 

Rural Districts of Isfahan Province
Faridan County